This is a list of commercial banks in Mauritania

 BNP Paribas (BNP)
 Société Générale (SGM)
 Chinguitty Bank
 Banque pour le Commerce et l'Investissement en Mauritanie (BACIM)
 Banque El Amana (BEA)
 Banque Al Wava Mauritanienne Islamique (BAMIS)
 Générale de Banque de Mauritanie (GBM)
 Banque pour le Commerce et l'Investissement (BCI)
 Banque Mauritanienne pour le Commerce International (BMCI)
 Banque Nationale de Mauritanie (BNM)
 Nouvelle Banque du Mauritania
(NBM)

External links
 Website of Central Bank of Mauritania (French) 
 Archived 2006 Website of Central Bank of Mauritania (French)

See also
 List of banks in Africa
 List of banks in the Arab world
 Central Bank of Mauritania
 Economy of Mauritania
 List of companies based in Mauritania

References

 
Banks
Mauritania
Mauritania